Clyde Russell Dengler (May 10, 1899 – August 15, 1992) served in the Pennsylvania State Senate, serving from 1969 to 1974.

References

Republican Party Pennsylvania state senators
1899 births
1992 deaths
20th-century American politicians